Merhülietsa Ward also known as Para Medical is a ward located under Nagaland's capital city, Kohima. The ward falls under the designated Ward No. 18 of the Kohima Municipal Council.

Education
Educational Institutions in Merhülietsa Ward:

Schools 
 Merhülietsa Government Middle School
 Merhülietsa School
 St. John School

See also
 Municipal Wards of Kohima

References

External links
 Map of Kohima Ward No. 18

Kohima
Wards of Kohima